Codonacanthus is a genus of flowering plants belonging to the family Acanthaceae.

Its native range is Assam, Southern China, Japan.

Species:

Codonacanthus pauciflorus 
Codonacanthus sanjappae 
Codonacanthus spicatus

References

Acanthaceae
Acanthaceae genera